Corrida das Blogueiras is a Brazilian reality show, in the competition and entertainment genres, created by YouTubers and digital influencers Eduardo Camargo and Filipe Oliveira, from the Diva Depressão channel, and produced by Dia Estúdio. The first season premiered on November 13, 2018, with episodes posted on the YouTube channel. Reality is a competition between less-recognized digital influencers, who face various challenges in the content creation business and become the winner.

The first season premiered on November 13, 2018, with 6 episodes in all.

The second season premiered on October 15, 2019, with 8 episodes in all.

The third season premiered on October 19, 2021, after a one-year hiatus due to the Covid-19 Pandemic, with 9 episodes in all.

The fourth season premiered on November 8, 2022, with 9 episodes in all.

Team

Presenters

Jury

Seasons

Season 1 (2018)

History

Season 2 (2019)

History

Season 3 (2021)

Bloguers

History

Documentary 
During the series finale on December 14, 2021, a Season 3 documentary was announced, with behind-the-scenes and interviews throughout the process. The Documentary will be released on December 21, 2021, on the Diva Depressão channel.

Season 4 (2022)

Bloguers 

÷=== History ===

References

External links 

 Site
 Corrida das blogueiras on Instagram

Brazilian reality television series
2018 Brazilian television series debuts